Wheatley may refer to:

Places
 Wheatley (crater), on Venus 
 Wheatley, Ontario, Canada
 Wheatley, Hampshire, England
 Wheatley, Oxfordshire, England
 Wheatley railway station
 Wheatley, South Yorkshire, England
 Wheatley, now Ben Rhydding, Bradford, West Yorkshire, England
 Wheatley, Calderdale, a place in Calderdale, United Kingdom
 North and South Wheatley, Nottinghamshire, England
 South Wheatley, Cornwall, England
 Wheatley, Arkansas, U.S.

Other uses
 Wheatley (surname), including a list of people with the name
 Wheatley (Portal, a character in the video game franchise
 Wheatley vodka, a brand of Buffalo Trace Distillery

See also
 
 Wheatley High School (disambiguation)
 Wheatley Hills (disambiguation)
 Wheatley School (disambiguation)
 Whately (disambiguation)